Sam D. Hamilton Noxubee National Wildlife Refuge is a  National Wildlife Refuge located in the U.S. state of Mississippi, in Noxubee, Oktibbeha, and Winston Counties. The refuge serves as a resting and feeding area for migratory birds and as example of proper land stewardship. Also, the refuge extensively manages land for the endangered red-cockaded woodpecker.

History
Land for the Noxubee NWR was obtained in the 1930s through the Resettlement Administration. During the 1930s, the land was controlled by the Bankhead-Jones Farm Tenant Act. In 1940, the land was established as a National Wildlife Refuge to ensure the wetlands would continue to be protected, providing migratory bird species and other animals a safe haven. A variety of species inhabit these lands including quail, deer, and turkey.

Additionally, there are four green tree reservoirs and sixteen smaller reservoirs which provide a habitat for wood stork, American alligator, bald eagle and other waterfowl.

The refuge partners with nearby Mississippi State University in an extensive research program with the Department of Wildlife and Fisheries and the Department of Forestry.

Originally named the Noxubee National Wildlife Refuge, the refuge was renamed for Sam D. Hamilton, a former director of the Fish and Wildlife Service, in February 2012.

Attractions

Goose Overlook
Goose Overlook is a  observation platform overlooking Bluff Lake. This area provides a wildlife viewing area for animals such as white-tailed deer and migrating Canada Geese.

Morgan Hill Overlook
Another observation on Morgan Hill provides a view of the  Loakfoma Lake.

Bluff Lake Boardwalk
This  boardwalk provides access to an overlook at cypress island on Bluff Lake.

Trail networks
The refuge has a trail system providing access to wildlife observation points, visit the refuge website for more information on individual hiking trails and boardwalks.

Hunting
One major attraction of the refuge is hunting, which is allowed throughout the year with differing windows for different species. Licensed hunters can hunt game such as deer, turkey, rabbit, and squirrel.

See also
 List of National Wildlife Refuges

References

External links

 Sam D. Hamilton Noxubee National Wildlife Refuge Website
 Sam D. Hamilton Noxubee National Wildlife Refuge Facebook Page
 Sam D. Hamilton Noxubee NWR Audio Visual Presentation
 Friends of Noxubee National Wildlife Refuge Website

Protected areas of Noxubee County, Mississippi
National Wildlife Refuges in Mississippi
Protected areas of Oktibbeha County, Mississippi
Protected areas of Winston County, Mississippi
Wetlands of Mississippi
Landforms of Noxubee County, Mississippi
Landforms of Oktibbeha County, Mississippi
Landforms of Winston County, Mississippi
Protected areas established in 1940
1940 establishments in Mississippi